The Liberal Democratic Party was a Cambodian political party founded in May 1990 by Sak Sutsakhan, a former commander in the Khmer People's National Liberation Armed Forces. The party was notably the first political party in Cambodia to hold a party congress following the 1991 Paris Peace Agreements.

History 
The party was created after infighting between Sutsakhan and Son Sann following the Paris Peace Accords of 1991 led Sutsakhan to split from the Khmer People's National Liberation Front (KPNLF), an anti-communist group originally started by Son Sann. In 1992, the Liberal Democratic Party held a party congress at Phnom Penh Olympic Stadium.

The Liberal Democratic Party won 62,698 votes (1.6%) in the 1993 national election, failing to win a single seat in the National Assembly.

References

1992 establishments in Cambodia
Conservative parties in Cambodia
Defunct liberal political parties
Defunct political parties in Cambodia
Liberal parties in Cambodia
Political parties established in 1992
Political parties with year of disestablishment missing
Republican parties in Cambodia